Marian Ulc (born Szałas, Poland, 1947) – a Polish sculptor, representing the naive art movement. His works have been displayed outside Poland, in Germany and Finland for instance.

References

External links 
Marian Ulc's homepage
Information about the artist on the Zagnańsk commune web page(Polish)

Naïve art
Folk artists
1947 births
Living people
20th-century Polish sculptors
Polish male sculptors
20th-century male artists
21st-century Polish sculptors